An egg slicer is a food preparation utensil used to slice peeled, hard-boiled eggs quickly and evenly. An egg slicer consists of a slotted dish for holding the egg and a hinged plate of wires or blades that can be closed to slice.

It was invented at the beginning of the 20th century by the German Willy Abel (1875–1951) who also invented the bread cutter. The first egg slicers were produced in Berlin-Lichtenberg.

Dutch comedic duo Van Kooten en de Bie created a mock documentary about a Dutch egg slicer factory in 1983.

As a musical instrument
Some egg slicers that have thin wires can be played as string instruments. A recorded example is English experimental music group Coil's 'The Gimp (Sometimes)', where primary group member John Balance played an egg slicer solo, dubbing it a 'mini-harp', on both the studio version and later live performances.

See also
Mandoline

References

Food preparation utensils
German inventions
Eggs (food)
20th-century inventions